Ladislau Şimon (Hungarian: László Simon, 25 September 1951 – 12 May 2005) was a super-heavyweight freestyle wrestler from Romania. He won a bronze medal at the 1976 Olympics, as well as the world title in 1974 and European title in 1976. After retiring from competitions he worked as a national wrestling coach.

References

External links

Biography of Ladislau Şimon 

1951 births
2005 deaths
Olympic wrestlers of Romania
Wrestlers at the 1976 Summer Olympics
Romanian male sport wrestlers
Olympic bronze medalists for Romania
Olympic medalists in wrestling
Medalists at the 1976 Summer Olympics
People from Târgu Mureș
Romanian sportspeople of Hungarian descent
European Wrestling Championships medalists
World Wrestling Championships medalists
20th-century Romanian people